Ross, Cromarty and Skye was a constituency of the House of Commons of the Parliament of the United Kingdom from 1983 to 1997. The constituency elected one Member of Parliament (MP) by the first-past-the-post system of election.

It was formed by merging the former Ross and Cromarty constituency with the Isle of Skye and the Isle of Raasay areas of the former Inverness constituency.

In 1997 most of the constituency became part of the then new Ross, Skye and Inverness West constituency. An Easter Ross area became part of the Caithness, Sutherland and Easter Ross constituency.

Boundaries
Ross and Cromarty District, Skye and Lochalsh District, and the Inverness District electoral divisions of Aird North, Aird South, and Charleston.

Local government areas

1983 to 1996

From 1983 to 1996 the constituency covered the Highland districts of Ross and Cromarty and Skye and Lochalsh.

1996 to 1997
See also Politics of the Highland Council area

Local government districts were abolished in 1996, and the constituency became an area within the Highland unitary council area. Throughout the remaining life of the constituency Highland Council maintained area committees named for the former districts, Ross and Cromarty and Skye and Lochalsh.

Members of Parliament

Elections results

Elections of the 1980s

Elections of the 1990s

References 

Historic parliamentary constituencies in Scotland (Westminster)
Ross and Cromarty
Skye and Lochalsh
Constituencies of the Parliament of the United Kingdom established in 1983
Constituencies of the Parliament of the United Kingdom disestablished in 1997
Highland constituencies, UK Parliament (historic)